Nhlangwini/Ntlangwini (Hlangwane) is a Bantu language of South Africa. It is located along the border between Xhosa and Zulu, but is more closely related to Swazi.

Nhlangwini People 
(Ethic Group)

Nhlangwini/Ntlangwini people are a small nguni ethnic group found in KZN South Coast, Ixopo,uMzimkhulu and in parts of the Eastern Cape areas such as Matatiele (kwaMzongwana) Tsolo,Tsomo, Ngqamakhwe and Keiskammahoek (kuQoboqobo)  

The Language derived from an animal called Reedbuck (INhlangu -Zulu/iNtlangu-Xhosa) 
The chief Nombewu a father of a prominent chief, inkosi uFodo of Nhlangwini clan in eGugwini, east of uMzimkhulu was a hunter with his son Fodo. 
It is said that the skin of inhlangu cannot be pierced by a spear. All that the hunters did when trying
to kill it was to aim at the position of the heart and then press
the spear so hard that the heart was interfered with without the
spear penetrating through the skin.
That is why Fodo was praised as: Umkhonto kawungeni ungena ngokucindetela. (Spear that does not
penetrate, it only penetrates on pressing hard).

Fodo used to present Dingane with the hides of this animal.
He, together with his people, were thus generally known as abantu
benhlangu (people of the inhlangu animal, hence abaseNhlangwini.

Calan praises: 

Dlamini, kaLusibalukhulu, uMdlovu, uMagaduzela, umabonel’empunzeni ne Hlangwini ngokugaduzela, ngob’iNhlangu yagijima, igabadela ibaleka umkhonto ka Nombewu no Fodo, ngoba isikhumba sayo asingangen’mkhonto , ungena kuphela ngokucinezelwa.

References 

•Phyllis Jane Nonhlanhla Zungu, 1989, Nhlangwini, a Tekela-Nguni Dialect and Its Relationship to "standard Zulu" and Other Nguni Dialects, University of Natal, Pietermaritzburg.

Languages of South Africa
Nguni languages